The Asiatic Museum (Азиатский музей) in Saint Petersburg was one of the first museums of Asian art in Europe. Its existence spanned 112 years from 1818 to 1930 when it was incorporated into the Institute of Oriental Manuscripts of the Russian Academy of Sciences.

In 1818, the Russian Academy of Sciences (RAS) learned that Jean-Baptiste Rousseau (1780–1831), the French consul at Aleppo and Tripoli (then both part of the Ottoman Empire), was selling his extensive collection of manuscripts written in the Arabic script.  In November of that year, the president of the RAS, Count Sergey Uvarov, wrote to the Board of the RAS requesting that a separate room be put aside in the Academy's cabinet of curiosities for storing this collection of manuscripts (which was eventually purchased by the RAS in two tranches, in 1819 and 1825), as well as other medals, manuscripts and books of oriental origin already in the Museum of the Imperial Academy of Science.  The result was the establishment of the Asiatic Museum of the RAS, in Saint Petersburg. 

The Asiatic Museum quickly established itself as the main institute for the collection and study of oriental manuscripts and books in Russia, as well as a major international centre for oriental studies, and by the time of the Russian Revolution in 1917, almost a hundred years after its foundation, it housed one of the most extensive collections of oriental manuscripts and printed books in the world.

Following the Russian Revolution, the Asiatic Museum continued under the same name until May 1930, when the Institute of Oriental Studies (IOS) of the Academy of Sciences of the USSR was founded, and the Asiatic Museum was incorporated into this new institute.

List of directors 
 Christian Martin Frähn (1818–1842)
 Johannes Albrecht Bernhard Dorn (1842–1881)
  Victor von Rosen (1881–1882)
 Ferdinand Johann Wiedemann (1882–1885)
 Friedrich Wilhelm Radloff (1885–1890)
 Karl Germanovich Salemann (1890–1916)
 Sergey Fyodorovich Oldenburg (1916–1930)

References 

Defunct art museums and galleries
Art museums and galleries in Saint Petersburg
1818 establishments in the Russian Empire
1930 disestablishments in Russia
Asian art museums in Russia
Art museums established in 1818
Art museums disestablished in 1930
Defunct museums in Russia